Tatumville is an unincorporated community in Alexander County, Illinois, United States. Tatumville is northwest of Tamms.

References

Unincorporated communities in Alexander County, Illinois
Unincorporated communities in Illinois
Cape Girardeau–Jackson metropolitan area